What Really Happened to the Class of '65? is an American anthology drama television series produced and aired in 1977–1978, created by Tony Bill. The series was inspired by the bestselling book What Really Happened to the Class of '65? by David Wallechinsky and Michael Medved. It was produced by George Eckstein.

Summary 
The drama of the show revolved around the main character, played by Tony Bill, who had graduated from the class of 1965 in Bret Harte High School, and who has now returned as a teacher to the school. The show would begin with his character opening up the old school photo book, flicking to a photo, and pondering what had happened to that particular student. The show would then show the story of that student, with Bill narrating.

The show featured music from the era, and was described as "a cross breed between Happy Days and Peyton Place" The show debuted at 10pm on NBC on December 8, 1977.

Grant High School in Van Nuys was used as a filming location for the series.

Cast 
Tony Bill played the main character, Sam Ashley. The rest of the cast of the show featured many of the mainstay actors of the 1970s, including Cliff De Young, Leslie Nielsen, John Ritter, Annette O'Toole, Meredith Baxter Birney, John Rubinstein, Jessica Walter, and Paul Burke.

Episode list

References

External links 
 
 What Really Happened to the Class of '65? at The Classic TV Archive

1977 American television series debuts
1978 American television series endings
1970s American anthology television series
1970s American drama television series
1970s American high school television series
NBC original programming
Television series about educators
Television series based on books
Television shows set in Los Angeles